Salem al-Hazmi (also transliterated as Alhazmi) (February 2, 1981 – September 11, 2001) was a Saudi Arabian terrorist. He was one of five terrorist hijackers of American Airlines Flight 77 as part of the September 11 attacks.

Al-Hazmi had a relatively long history with al-Qaeda before being selected for the attacks. He obtained a tourist visa through the Visa Express program and arrived in the United States in June 2001 where he would settle in New Jersey with other American 77 hijackers up until the attacks.

On September 11, 2001, al-Hazmi boarded American Airlines Flight 77 and helped subdue the passengers and crew for Hani Hanjour, the pilot among the hijackers, to crash the plane into the western facade of the Pentagon. His older brother, Nawaf al-Hazmi, was another hijacker aboard the same flight. Along with Ahmed al-Haznawi, who was one of the hijackers on United Airlines Flight 93 and Hamza al-Ghamdi, who was also co-hijacker with his older brother on United Airlines Flight 175, he was among the youngest hijackers in the attacks.

History
Salem al-Hazmi was born on February 2, 1981, to Muhammad Salim al-Hazmi, a grocer, in Mecca, Saudi Arabia. His father described Salem as a quarrelsome teenager who had problems with alcohol and petty theft. However, he stopped drinking and began to attend the mosque about three months before he left his family.

There are reports that he fought in Afghanistan with his brother, Nawaf al-Hazmi, and other reports say the two fought together in Chechnya. Salem al-Hazmi was an al-Qaeda veteran by the time he was selected for participation in the 9/11 attacks. U.S. intelligence learned of al-Hazmi's involvement with al-Qaeda as early as 1999, but he was not placed on any watchlists.

Known as Bilal during the preparations, both he and Ahmed al-Ghamdi flew to Beirut in November 2000, though on separate flights.

Along with Nawaf al-Hazmi and several other future hijackers, Salem al-Hazmi may have attended the 2000 Al Qaeda Summit in Kuala Lumpur, Malaysia. It was there that the details of the 9/11 attacks were decided upon.

In the United States
According to the FBI and the 9/11 Commission report, al-Hazmi first entered the United States on June 29, 2001, although there are numerous unconfirmed reports that he was living in San Antonio, Texas, with fellow hijacker Satam al-Suqami much earlier. Al-Hazmi used the controversial Visa Express program to gain entry into the country.

Al-Hazmi moved to Paterson, New Jersey, where he lived with Hani Hanjour. Both were among the five hijackers who applied for Virginia identity cards at the Arlington office of the Virginia Department of Motor Vehicles on August 2, 2001, although Salem al-Hazmi already held an NJ identity card.

On August 27, brothers Nawaf and Salem al-Hazmi purchased flight tickets through Travelocity.com using the former's Visa card.

With the four other Flight 77 hijackers, he worked out at a Gold's Gym in Greenbelt, Maryland, from September 2 to September 6 of the same year.

Attacks

On September 11, 2001, al-Hazmi boarded American Airlines Flight 77. Airport surveillance video from Washington's Dulles Airport shows two of the five hijackers, including Salem al-Hazmi, being pulled aside to undergo additional scrutiny after setting off metal detectors.

The flight was scheduled to depart at 08:10, but ended up departing 10 minutes late from Gate D26 at Dulles. The last normal radio communications from the aircraft to air traffic control occurred at 08:50:51. At 08:54, Flight 77 began to deviate from its normal, assigned flight path and turned south, and then hijackers set the flight's autopilot heading for Washington, D.C. Passenger Barbara Olson called her husband, United States Solicitor General Theodore Olson, and reported that the plane had been hijacked and that the assailants had box cutters and knives.  At 09:37, American Airlines Flight 77 crashed into the west facade of the Pentagon, killing all 64 aboard (including the hijackers), along with 125 on the ground in the Pentagon.  In the recovery process at the Pentagon, remains of all five Flight 77 hijackers were identified through a process of elimination, as not matching any DNA samples for the victims, and put into custody of the FBI. Forensics teams confirmed that it seemed two of the hijackers were brothers, based on their DNA similarities.

Mistaken identity allegations
Shortly after the attacks, several sources reported that Salem al-Hazmi, 26, was alive and working at a petrochemical plant in Yanbu, Saudi Arabia. He claimed that his passport had been stolen by a pickpocket in Cairo three years before, and that the pictures and details such as date of birth released to the public by the FBI were his own. He also stated that he had never visited the United States, but volunteered to fly to the U.S. to prove his innocence. On September 19, Al-Sharq Al-Awsat published his photograph alongside Badr Al-Hazmi's, who they claimed was the actual hijacker who had stolen his identity.

After some confusion and doubt Saudi Arabia admitted that in fact the names of the hijackers were correct. "The names that we got confirmed that," Interior Minister Prince Nayef said in an interview with The Associated Press. "Their families have been notified." Nayef said the Saudi leadership was shocked to learn 15 of the hijackers were from Saudi Arabia and said it was natural that the kingdom had not noticed their involvement beforehand.

See also
 PENTTBOM

References

1981 births
2001 deaths
Participants in the September 11 attacks
People from Mecca
Saudi Arabian al-Qaeda members
American Airlines Flight 77
Saudi Arabian mass murderers
Saudi Arabian murderers of children